Enningdalsälven is a river in Sweden and Norway.

References

Rivers of Västra Götaland County
Rivers of Viken
Rivers of Norway